Comeback Kid may refer to:

People
Bill Clinton, a nickname he applied to himself after an unexpectedly strong second-place showing in the 1992 New Hampshire presidential primary
Joe Montana, American football player
Stu Ungar, American professional gambler

Film and television
The Comeback Kid (film), a 1980 TV film
"Comeback Kid", an episode of Disney's Bonkers
"Comeback Kid", an episode from season 4 of Parks and Recreation
The Comeback Kid, a 2015 comedy special by John Mulaney

Music
Comeback Kid (band), a Canadian hardcore punk band from Winnipeg
"Comeback Kid" (Sleigh Bells song), 2012
"Comeback Kid" (The Band Perry song), 2016
"The Comeback Kid", a song by Keith Whitely from the 1994 album Keith Whitley: A Tribute Album
"The Comeback Kid", a song by B. Reith from the 2009 album Now Is Not Forever
"Comeback Kid", a song by Kip Moore from the 2015 album Wild ones
"Comeback Kid", a 2016 song by Kasabian
"Comeback Kid", a 2018 song by Sharon Van Etten
"Comeback Kid (That's my Dog)", a song by Brett Dennen from the 2011 album Loverboy

See also
Comeback (disambiguation)

Nicknames of politicians
Nicknames in association football
Nicknames in sports